The Athletics Federation of Nigeria is the governing body for the sport of athletics in Nigeria. It is a member of the Confederation of African Athletics and the International Association of Athletics Federations.

It was founded as the Central Committee of the Amateur Athletic Association of Nigeria in 1944.
The AFN is headquartered at the Nigeria National Stadium in Garki, Abuja.

It organizes the annual AFN Golden League competition which is a domestic competition with a similar format to the now defunct IAAF Golden League.

Its president has been Ibrahim Shehu Gusau since 2017 till date.

References

External links
 The Athletics Federation of Nigeria

Nigeria
National governing bodies for athletics
Sports organizations established in 1944